The 2001 United States state legislative elections were held on November 6, 2001, during President George W. Bush's first term in office. Elections were held for four legislative chambers in two states, simultaneous to those states' gubernatorial elections. Both chambers of the Northern Mariana Islands legislature were up as well. 

These were the first elections affected by the 2000 redistricting cycle, which reapportioned state legislatures based on data from the 2000 United States census.

Republicans maintained control of both houses of the Virginia General Assembly, while Democrats won control of the New Jersey General Assembly, and evenly split the State Senate. Democrats additionally won control of the Washington House of Representatives through special elections.

Summary table 
Regularly-scheduled elections were held in 4 of the 99 state legislative chambers in the United States. Nationwide, regularly-scheduled elections were held for 260 of the 7,383 legislative seats. This table only covers regularly-scheduled elections; additional special elections took place concurrently with these regularly-scheduled elections.

Results

State-by-state

Upper houses

Lower houses

Results

Territories

Upper houses

Lower houses

Notes

References

 
 
State legislative elections
State legislature elections in the United States by year